Monica Dixon is the executive director of Forward Together PAC, the political action committee of former Virginia Governor Mark Warner.

She was the Deputy Chief of Staff to former Vice President Al Gore, and was one of his top political aides during the 2000 Presidential Election. During the election she was tasked with running the Nashville war room of the Gore-Lieberman campaign.

Ms. Dixon is also the former Chief of Staff to the House Democratic Caucus and the Director of Field Communications for the America Coming Together committee.

References 

Michael D. Shear (June 11, 2005) "Warner Prepares to Take On National Role". Washington Post

External links
Forward Together PAC
Draft Mark Warner for President 2008

20th-century births
Living people
Virginia Democrats
Women in Virginia politics
Year of birth missing (living people)
21st-century American women